Yeongi County (Yeongi-gun) was a county in South Chungcheong Province, South Korea now part of Sejong.
Yeongi County was abolished as this area was incorporated into Sejong City as of 1 July 2012.

Jochiwon is the main city within Yeongi.

External links
 Hong-ik University

History of Sejong City
Counties of South Chungcheong Province
Former subdivisions of South Korea
Counties of Korea